In English-speaking culture, a milkman joke is a joke cycle exploiting fear of adultery and mistaken paternity.  This class of jokes has its roots in the early part of the 20th century, prior to the regular availability of milk in supermarkets.  At that time, milk in glass bottles was delivered directly to customers' houses by milkmen, generally in the morning (at which time empty bottles were also collected). Typically, men were the main financial  supporters of their families, while women tended to remain at home to care for their children and house. As the milkman would visit the home at a time when the husband would be away at work, this created an opportune situation for adultery.

Often times, a different profession will replace the milkman in various jokes.  For instance, in Spain, 'milkman' jokes are told about butaneros: persons who deliver butane, bottled fuel gas, to households without a pipeline gas hookup. Similar jokes referring to other professions, such as postmen, plumbers, pizza delivery drivers, and swimming pool cleaners, are also known.

Example

In arts and entertainment

Monty Python's Flying Circus had a short Seduced Milkmen sketch, where a lonely housewife lures the milkman into her house and up many stairs, then shoves him in a room with nine other milkmen, many of whom are very old (and two skeletons wearing milkmen uniforms) and locks the door. 
An entire episode of Father Ted ("Speed 3") was based upon the joke.  
In the South Park episode "Insecurity," the male inhabitants believe the local delivery man is having affairs with their wives and one of the elder inhabitants of the city reveals that their situation was the same as his during his era with milkmen.
The title of the Eugene O'Neill drama 'The Iceman Cometh' plays on this type of joke.
Benny Hill had a chart-topping hit with "Ernie (The Fastest Milkman in the West)." Hill makes a key adjustment in that the target of Ernie's affections is widowed.
The Raconteurs' 2008 rock song "Carolina Drama," a murder ballad surrounding ambiguous paternity, ends with a reference to the milkman trope ("If you must know the truth about the tale / Go and ask the milkman").

References

Joke cycles
Milk
Adultery